Candyland is an American electronic music duo consisting of Josephine "Josie" Mary Martin (born December 17, 1988) and Ethan Davis.

In 2014, Ethan Davis officially left the project, therefore transforming Candyland into a solo act. However, in July 2021, Ethan and Josie announced that they had reunited as a duo, and they released their comeback single, "Nirvana" in 2022.

Critical reception 
Matthew Meadow of Your EDM describes "Speechless" as having "a fresh groove to it that definitely heats up the dancefloor" with "a strong house vibe that combines with flutes and synths from tropical house, creating a pleasant combination that works for any setting".

EDM Sauce states that the "new Candyland gem brings infectious vocals, punchy basslines, melody-rich flute and synth elements, as well as an overall feel-good vibe".

Alexander Davis of EDMTunes said 'While "Speechless" is a clear departure from banging big room, it still has a refined groove that is sure to ignite the dance floor', going on to comment that "Candyland deftly fuses indie-leaning vocals with strong electronic textures that give the tune a deep groove that will have you moving before you know it".

Discography

Singles

References

External links 

American electronic music duos
American DJs
1988 births
Living people
Monstercat artists
21st-century American musicians
21st-century American women musicians
Electronic dance music duos
Spinnin' Records artists